Teimuraz (died c. 1768), of the Bagrationi Dynasty, was King of Imereti (western Georgia) from 1766 to 1768. A son of Prince Mamuka, sometime claimant to the crown of Imereti, he was enthroned by the Ottoman government after the deposition of his cousin, King Solomon I. He ruled under the Turkish protection until Solomon regained the throne with the Russian support in 1768. Teimuraz was put in the Mukhuri prison and was never seen again.

References 

1768 deaths
Bagrationi dynasty of the Kingdom of Imereti
Kings of Imereti
18th-century people from Georgia (country)
Year of birth unknown
Eastern Orthodox monarchs